"The Superinvestors of Graham-and-Doddsville" is an article by Warren Buffett promoting value investing, published in the Fall, 1984 issue of Hermes, Columbia Business School magazine. It was based on a speech given on May 17, 1984, at the Columbia University School of Business in honor of the 50th anniversary of the publication of Benjamin Graham and David Dodd's book Security Analysis. The speech and article challenged the idea that equity markets are efficient through a study of nine successful investment funds generating long-term returns above the market index. All these funds were managed by Benjamin Graham's alumni, following the same "Graham-and-Doddsville" value investing strategy but each investing in different assets and stocks.

The speech

Columbia Business School arranged celebration of Graham–Dodd's jubilee as a contest between Michael Jensen, a University of Rochester professor and a proponent of the efficient-market hypothesis, and Buffett, who was known to oppose it. 

Jensen proposed a thought experiment: if a large group of people flipped coins and predicted if the coins would land heads or tails, over time, a small number of participants would, by random chance or luck, correctly predict the outcome of a lengthy series of flips. Jensen used the coin-flipping as a parallel for the fact that most active investors tend to under-perform the stock market, further arguing that the small number of investors who regularly beat the averages are doing so by luck or random chance rather than by applying any analysis or strategy to their investing decisions. 

Buffett grabbed Jensen's metaphor and started his own speech with the same coin tossing experiment. There was one difference, he noted: somehow, a statistically significant share of the winning minority belongs to the same school. They follow value investing rules set up by Graham and Dodd, and consistently beat the averages by applying the same methods to different investment assets.

The statement

Buffett starts the article with a rebuttal of a popular academic opinion that Graham and Dodd's approach ("look for values with a significant margin of safety relative to [stock] prices") had been made obsolete by improvements in market analysis and information technology. If the markets are efficient, then no one can beat the market in the long run; and apparent long-term success can happen by pure chance only. However, argues Buffett, if a substantial share of these long-term winners belong to a group of value investing adherents, and they operate independently of each other, then their success is more than a lottery win; it is a triumph of the right strategy.

Buffett then proceeds to present nine successful investment funds. One is his own Buffett Partnership, liquidated in 1969. Two are pension funds with three and eight portfolio managers; Buffett asserts that he had influence in selecting value-minded managers and the overall strategy of the funds. The other six funds were managed by Buffett's business associates or people otherwise well-known to Buffett. The seven investment partnerships demonstrated average long-term returns with a double-digit lead over the market average, while the two pension funds, bound to more conservative portfolio mixes, showed 5% and 8% leads.

Buffett takes special care to explain that the nine funds have little in common except the value strategy and personal connections to himself. Even when there are no striking differences in stock portfolio, individual mixes and timing of purchases are substantially different. The managers were indeed independent of each other.

Buffett made three side notes concerning value investment theory. First, he underscored Graham–Dodd's postulate: the higher the margin between price of undervalued stock and its value, the lower is investors' risk. On the opposite, as margin gets thinner, risks increase. Second, potential returns diminish with increasing size of the fund, as the number of available undervalued stocks decreases. Finally, analyzing the backgrounds of seven successful managers, he makes a conclusion that an individual either accepts value investing strategy at first sight, or never accepts it, regardless of training and other people's examples. "There seems to be a perverse human characteristic that likes to make easy things difficult... it's likely to continue this way. Ships will sail around the world, but the Flat Earth Society will flourish... and those who read their Graham and Dodd will continue to prosper".

Influence

Graham-and-Doddsville influenced Seth Klarman's 1991 Margin of Safety and was cited by Klarman as a principal source; "Buffett's argument has never, to my knowledge, been addressed by the efficient-market theorists; they evidently prefer to continue to prove in theory what was refuted in practice". Klarman's book, never reprinted, has achieved a cult status, and sells for four-digit prices.

Buffett's article was a "titular subject" of 2001 Value Investing: From Graham to Buffett and Beyond.

In 2005 Louis Lowenstein compiled Graham-and-Doddsville Revisited – a review of the changes in mutual fund economics, comparing the Goldfarb Ten funds against Buffett's value investing standard. Lowenstein pointed out that "value investing requires not just patient managers but also patient investors", since value investing managers have also demonstrated regular drops in portfolio values (offset by subsequent profits).

Reactions

Buffett, despite his untarnished reputation in mainstream business press, remains rarely cited within traditional academia in general terms and the Superinvestors article has been almost entirely ignored. A 2004 search of 23,000 papers on economics revealed only 20 references to any publication by Buffett. 

A significant share of references simply rebut Buffett's statements or reduce his own success to pure luck and probability theory. William F. Sharpe (1995) called him "a three-sigma event" (1 in 370), Michael Lewis (1989) a "big winner produced by a random game". On the other hand, Aswath Damodaran, Professor of Finance at the Stern School of Business at NYU, referred to Buffet's findings as a proof that markets are not always efficient. 

Joe Carlen, in his 2012 biography of Graham, notes that most individual investors discussed in the Superinvestors article have continued to consistently apply Graham's principles, and most also continued to perform well (all save Pearlmuter and Guerin, who did not have direct contact with Graham). These investors often regularly beat the market averages in subsequent years, but usually not to the extreme levels they did from the 1960s to '80s. "[T]he fact that five of the seven superinvestors continued to excel after 1984 proves that [Buffett's] central argument remains valid."

Notes

References

 
 
 
 
 
 
 
 
 

1984 speeches
Magazine articles
Buffett family
Investment
Fundamental_analysis